Value engineering (VE) is a systematic analysis of the functions of various components and materials to lower the cost of goods, products and services with a tolerable loss of performance or functionality. Value, as defined, is the ratio of function to cost. Value can therefore be manipulated by either improving the function or reducing the cost. It is a primary tenet of value engineering that basic functions be preserved and not be reduced as a consequence of pursuing value improvements. The term "value management" is sometimes used as a synonym of "value engineering", and both promote the planning and delivery of projects with improved performance 

The reasoning behind value engineering is as follows: if marketers expect a product to become practically or stylistically obsolete within a specific length of time, they can design it to only last for that specific lifetime. The products could be built with higher-grade components, but with value engineering they are not because this would impose an unnecessary cost on the manufacturer, and to a limited extent also an increased cost on the purchaser. Value engineering will reduce these costs. A company will typically use the least expensive components that satisfy the product's lifetime projections at a risk of product and company reputation.

Due to the very short life spans, however, which is often a result of this "value engineering technique", planned obsolescence has become associated with product deterioration and inferior quality. Vance Packard once claimed this practice gave engineering as a whole a bad name, as it directed creative engineering energies toward short-term market ends. Philosophers such as Herbert Marcuse and Jacque Fresco have also criticized the economic and societal implications of this model.

History
Value engineering began at General Electric Co. during World War II. Because of the war, there were shortages of skilled labour, raw materials, and component parts. Lawrence Miles, Jerry Leftow, and Harry Erlicher at G.E. looked for acceptable substitutes. They noticed that these substitutions often reduced costs, improved the product, or both. What started out as an accident of necessity was turned into a systematic process. They called their technique "value analysis" or "value control".

The U S Navy's Bureau of Ships established a formal program of value engineering, overseen by Miles and Raymond Fountain, also from G.E., in 1957.

Since the 1970's the US Government's General Accounting Office (GAO) has recognised the benefit of value engineering. In a 1992 statement by L. Nye Stevens, Director of Government Business Operations Issues within the GAO, referred to "considerable work" done by the GAO on value engineering and the office's recommendation that VE should be adopted by "all federal construction agencies".

Dr. Paul Collopy, UAH Professor, ISEEM Department, has recommended an improvement to value engineering known as Value-Driven Design.

Description
Value engineering is sometimes taught within the project management, industrial engineering or architecture body of knowledge as a technique in which the value of a system’s outputs is superficially optimized by distorting a mix of performance (function) and costs. It is based on an analysis investigating systems, equipment, facilities, services, and supplies for providing necessary functions at superficial low life cycle cost while meeting the misunderstood requirement targets in performance, reliability, quality, and safety. In most cases this practice identifies and removes necessary functions of value expenditures, thereby decreasing the capabilities of the manufacturer and/or their customers.  What this practice disregards in providing necessary functions of value are expenditures such as equipment maintenance and relationships between employee, equipment, and materials.  For example, a machinist is unable to complete their quota because the drill press is temporarily inoperable due to lack of maintenance and the material handler is not doing their daily checklist, tally, log, invoice, and accounting of maintenance and materials each machinist needs to maintain the required productivity and adherence to section 4306.

VE follows a structured thought process that is based exclusively on "function", i.e. what something "does", not what it "is". For example, a screwdriver that is being used to stir a can of paint has a "function" of mixing the contents of a paint can and not the original connotation of securing a screw into a screw-hole. In value engineering "functions" are always described in a two word abridgment consisting of an active verb and measurable noun (what is being done – the verb – and what it is being done to – the noun) and to do so in the most non-descriptive way possible. In the screwdriver and can of paint example, the most basic function would be "blend liquid" which is less descriptive than "stir paint" which can be seen to limit the action (by stirring) and to limit the application (only considers paint). 

Value engineering uses rational logic (a unique "how" - "why" questioning technique) and an irrational analysis of function to identify relationships that increase value. It is considered a quantitative method similar to the scientific method, which focuses on hypothesis-conclusion approaches to test relationships, and operations research, which uses model building to identify predictive relationships.

Legal terminology
In the United States, value engineering is specifically mandated for federal agencies by section 4306 of the National Defense Authorization Act for Fiscal Year 1996, which amended the Office of Federal Procurement Policy Act (41 U.S.C. 401 et seq.):
“Each executive agency shall establish and maintain cost-effective value engineering procedures and processes."
"As used in this section, the term ‘value engineering’ means an analysis of the functions of a program, project, system, product, item of equipment, building, facility, service, or supply of an executive agency, performed by qualified agency or contractor personnel, directed at improving performance, reliability, quality, safety, and life cycle costs."

An earlier bill, HR 281, the "Systematic Approach for Value Engineering Act" was proposed in 1990, which would have mandated the use of VE in major federally-sponsored construction, design or IT system contracts. This bill identified the objective of a value engineering review as "reducing all costs (including initial and long-term costs) and improving quality, performance, productivity, efficiency, promptness, reliability, maintainability, and aesthetics".

Federal Acquisition Regulation (FAR) part 48 provides direction to federal agencies on the use of VE techniques. The FAR provides for 
an incentive approach, under which a contractor's participation in VE is voluntary; under this approach a contractor may at its own expense develop and submit a value engineering change proposal (VECP) for agency consideration, or
a mandatory program, where the agency directs and funds for a specific VE project.

Value engineering in the United Kingdom
In the United Kingdom, the lawfulness of undertaking value engineering discussions with a supplier in advance of contract award is one of the issues which was highlighted during the inquiry into the Grenfell Tower fire of 2017.

Professional association
The Society of American Value Engineers (SAVE) was established in 1959. Since 1996 it has been known as SAVE International.

See also 
Benefits realisation management
Cost
Cost engineering
Cost overrun
ISO 15686
Muntzing
Overengineering
Value theory

References

Further reading
 Cooper, R. and Slagmulder, R. (1997): Target Costing and Value Engineering
 "Value Optimization for Project and Performance Management by Robert B. Stewart, CVS-Life, FSAVE, PMP"

External links
Lawrence D. Miles Value Foundation
SAVE International - American Value engineering society
wertanalyse.com - Many links regarding VE organizations and publications
The Canadian Society of Value Analysis - Value Engineering in Canada
Value Engineering’s History in Construction- American Institute of Architects - AIA
 The Institute of Value Management, UK
The APTE method

Industrial engineering
Design for X
Cost engineering